Hutton Rudby is a village and civil parish situated  west of the market town of Stokesley in the Hambleton District, North Yorkshire, England. At the 2011 census, village's parish and built-up area subdivision had population of 1,572 while its main population (including Rudby) had a population of 1,968.

Geography
It is situated close to the A19. It is joined to the village of Rudby by a bridge spanning the River Leven. It is near to the towns of Stokesley, Middlesbrough, Yarm and Northallerton. There are 6 village greens as there were a lot of livestock farmers that lived in and around the village.

Amenities
There are many amenities such as a doctors surgery, two pubs, two hairdressers, a beauty salon, cricket club, village hall, primary school, car mechanic,  Methodist Church Community Hub and a SPAR shop and fuel station.

Community and Culture
There is a beacon on the lower village green which was placed there and first lit in 2012 to mark The Queens Diamond Jubilee as part of the Burning the Beacons commemoration. The last time it was lit was the 100th Anniversary of the Armistice in 2018. There is also a flagpole which is used to commemorate national events, the most recent even being the passing of Prince Philip. Maypole dancing also took place on the village green.

Notable residents
It has been home to Paul Gascoigne and Fabrizio Ravanelli, during their respective careers playing for Middlesbrough Football Club. Ex Scottish football player Gordon McQueen, and Steve Agnew (who is the current assistant first team coach for Newcastle United) live in the village.

Landmarks
Rudby Hall is a Grade II* listed house, built in 1838 for Lady Amelia Cary, illegitimate daughter of King William IV, and her husband Lucius Cary, 10th Viscount Falkland. In 2014 it was re-opened after restoration for use as a wedding venue.

There is a Norman church of All Saints which stands alongside the River Leven at the bottom of Rudby Bank. Sir Rex Hunt, the Governor of the Falkland Islands at the time of the Falklands War in 1982, was buried in the churchyard in 2012. Hutton Rudby is also the home of a cholera mound, most notable as it is the grave of some 23 people who died in the cholera outbreak of 1832.

References

External links

Villages in North Yorkshire
Civil parishes in North Yorkshire